Snake's Venom is a 1982 Czechoslovak drama film directed by František Vláčil. It stars Josef Vinklář. The film focuses on theme of alcoholism. The film follows 18-years student Vlaďka who tries to help her father Jan Veselý with alcoholism.

Plot
The film follows young student Vlaďka. Her mother recently died and she never met her father. She decides to meet him. She finds him on Geologic research where he lives in a caravan. She reveals to him that she is his daughter. Father isn't enthusiastic, but they grow closer to each other. Vlaďka stays and meets her father's friends and environment he lives in. She finds out that her father has problems with alcohol and often changes partners. His reputation is not good. He is a broken man who lost all illusions and ideals. She tries to help him to change his lifestyle, but he is unable to overcome his problems with alcohol. It leads to arguments between them and Vlaďka leaves. She leaves a note saying that they can meet again when he stops drinking. Everything returns to old tracks.

Cast
Josef Vinklář as Jan Veselý
Ilona Svobodová as Vlaďka Novotná
Ferdinand Krůta as Dědek
Karel Heřmánek as Péťa
Miriam Kantorková as Mácová
Josef Žluťák Hrubý as Tonek
Jan Hrušínský as Martin

References

External links
 

1982 films
Czech black-and-white films
Czech drama films
1980s Czech-language films
Czechoslovak black-and-white films
Films about alcoholism
Films directed by František Vláčil
1982 drama films
1980s Czech films